Fulton-Itawamba County Airport  was a public use airport located five nautical miles (9 km) northeast of the central business district of Fulton, a city in Itawamba County, Mississippi, United States. It was owned by the Fulton-Itawamba County Airport Board. As per the FAA's National Plan of Integrated Airport Systems for 2009-2013, it was classified as a general aviation airport.

The airport was closed in 1999.

Facilities and aircraft 
It has one runway designated 17/35 with an asphalt surface measuring 3,000 by 60 feet (914 x 18 m).

References

External links 
 Aerial photo as of 3 March 1996 from USGS The National Map via MSR Maps
 

Defunct airports in Mississippi
Buildings and structures in Itawamba County, Mississippi